Fiil may refer to:

Gerda Fiil (1927–1994), Danish resistance member
Gudrun Fiilil (1890–1972), Danish resistance member
Kirstine Fiil (1918–1983), Danish resistance member
Marius Fiil (1893–1944), Danish resistance member
Niels Fiil (1920–1944), Danish resistance member